Criminal court may refer to:

 A court that tries offenses against criminal law
Criminal justice
Criminal Court (film), a 1946 American film.

See also 
Cour d'assises, France
Court of assizes (Belgium)